André Ostier (1906–1994) was a French photographer well known for his artists' portraits and photo reports on "la vie parisienne"

Biography 
Born into a middle-class Parisian family, he began his career as a bookseller ("À La Page") and then as a journalist before becoming a photographer, taking a series of portraits of artists and fashion photos published in the pre-war illustrated press. He travels a lot, takes pictures during his trips and leads a very intense social life in the world of art and culture.

At the beginning of the war, after a first exhibition in 1940, he worked in the south of France and photographed actors (Micheline Presles, Pierre Jourdan...) and painters (Henri Matisse, Aristide Maillol, Pierre Bonnard...). In Paris, he photographed the occupied city as well as the Château de Versailles with its sandbagged sculptures, images that inspired Paul Eluard when they were published in Vogue français in 1945.

Arrested for acts of resistance in 1944, the photographer was incarcerated in the Santé prison.  After fearing the worst (Ostier was of Jewish origin), he was freed when General Leclerc's troops entered Paris. He then followed and photographed the troops in the Alsace campaign, taking several portraits of André Malraux.

After the war, André Ostier, whose reputation was already well established, became friends with Christian Dior and Jacques Fath whose new-look creations he photographed. He would later photograph Yves Saint-Laurent, Pierre Cardin, Coco Chanel and Marcel Rochas with the same warm empathy.

The trips follow one another: India, China, Thailand, North Africa, Europe...

André Ostier died in January 1994, leaving behind a body of work that brings together numerous photographic testimonies, precious for the understanding of the great sociological, intellectual and artistic periods that forged the modernity of the 20th century.

Portraits 
He captured the creative spirit and environment of painters such as Pierre Bonnard, Henri Matisse, Joan Miró, Pablo Picasso, Fernand Léger, Marc Chagall, Francis Bacon, David Hockney, etc.; writers such as Simone de Beauvoir, Jean Cocteau, Truman Capote, Jean Genet, Paul Valéry and Tennessee Williams; and fashion designers Coco Chanel, Christian Dior and Yves Saint Laurent.

Parties 
He also immortalized the grand parties of the 1950s and 1960s, where masks and costumes frequently heightened the festive atmosphere. Subjects included the Duke and Duchess of Windsor, Marie-Laure de Noailles, Carlos de Beistegui, Jacqueline de Ribes, Barbara Hutton.

Exhibitions

Solo Exhibitions 

 June 13 - September 1, 2019: André Ostier, Portraits of artists, Musée Matisse de la Ville de Nice.
 May 18 - July 28, 2006 : André Ostier, Photographs, Yves Saint-Laurent Museum in Paris7.
 1989 : Masks and Bergamasks, Galveston Arts Center in Houston.
 1988 : Masques and Bergamasques, FIAF French Institute/Alliance Française de New York.
 August 17 - September 23, 1993 : André Ostier Photographs - Colette's time, Association Arcade Colette in Paris.
 November 4 1982 - January 9 1983 : André Ostier. Photographs of painters and sculptors 1941-1982 [Mois de la photo], Musée Bourdelle in Paris8.
 July 30 - August 11, 1988: Photographs André Ostier, French Cultural Center of Tangier.
 16 May - 30 May 1957 : Images of Mount Athos, Connaissance du Monde in Paris.

Collective exhibitions 

 January 27 - March 28 1993 : TANGER - Regards Choisis, Institut du Monde Arabe.
 5 - 26 June 1991 : Hommage à Bettina - Photographie de mode 1945-1955, Institut International de la mode à Marseille.
 October 12 - December 2 1989 : Jean Cocteau The Mirror and the Mask : A Photo-Biography, Lieberman and Saul Gallery in New-York

References 

French photographers
1906 births
1994 deaths